The 2001 Tropicana 400 was the 18th stock car race of the 2001 NASCAR Winston Cup Series season and the inaugural running of the event. The race was held on July 15, 2001, in Joliet, Illinois at Chicagoland Speedway, a 1.5 mile (2.41 km) tri-oval speedway. The race took the scheduled 267 laps to complete. Kevin Harvick, driving for Richard Childress Racing, would dominate the late stages of the race to win his second career NASCAR Winston Cup Series win and his second and final win of the season. To fill out the podium, Robert Pressley of Jasper Motorsports and Ricky Rudd of Robert Yates Racing would finish second and third, respectively.

Background

Chicagoland Speedway is a 1.5 miles (2.41 km) tri-oval speedway in Joliet, Illinois, southwest of Chicago. The speedway opened in 2001 and currently hosts NASCAR racing. Until 2011, the speedway also hosted the IndyCar Series, recording numerous close finishes including the closest finish in IndyCar history. The speedway is owned and operated by International Speedway Corporation and located adjacent to Route 66 Raceway.

Entry list
(R) denotes rookie driver

Practice

First practice 
The first practice session was held on Thursday, July 12, at 2:00 PM CST, and would last for an hour and 25 minutes.

Second practice 
The second practice session was held on Thursday, July 12, at 5:05 PM CST, and would last for an hour and 25 minutes.

Third practice 
The third practice session was held on Friday, July 13, at 11:00 AM CST, and would last for an hour and 55 minutes.

Fourth practice 
The fourth practice session was held on Saturday, July 14, at 11:30 AM CST, and would last for 45 minutes.

Fifth and final practice 
The fifth and final practice session, sometimes referred to as Happy Hour, was held on Saturday, July 14, at 1:00 PM CST, and would last for 45 minutes.

Qualifying
Qualifying was held on Friday, July 13, at 3:05 PM CST. Each driver would have two laps to set a fastest time; the fastest of the two would count as their official qualifying lap. Positions 1-36 would be decided on time, while positions 37-43 would be based on provisionals. Six spots are awarded by the use of provisionals based on owner's points. The seventh is awarded to a past champion who has not otherwise qualified for the race. If no past champ needs the provisional, the next team in the owner points will be awarded a provisional.

Four drivers would fail to qualify: Kyle Petty, Dave Marcis, Mike Bliss, and Shawna Robinson.

Full qualifying results

Race results

References

2001 NASCAR Winston Cup Series
NASCAR races at Chicagoland Speedway
July 2001 sports events in the United States
2001 in sports in Illinois